Rasmus Mattias Bengtsson (born 26 June 1986) is a Swedish former professional footballer who played as a centre back. Starting off his professional career with Trelleborgs FF in 2006, he went on to represent Hertha BSC in the German Bundesliga and Twente in the Dutch Eredivise before retiring at his boyhood club Malmö FF in 2021. A full international between 2009 and 2014, he won four caps for the Sweden national team.

Career

Early career
Bengtsson started his career in his home town club Malmö FF. He transferred to Superettan side Trelleborgs FF in 2006 after having failed to make into the first team at Malmö FF. Bengtsson made his professional debut for Trelleborg in 2006. During his time in Trelleborg Bengtsson also changed his preferred position from striker to central defender. With Trelleborg he won the Superettan title of 2006 as the club were promoted to the first tier of Sweden, Allsvenskan. Bengtsson played a further three seasons in Allsvenskan with the club before he departed for German side Hertha BSC in the summer of 2009.

Hertha BSC
In August 2009, Bengtsson transferred to Hertha BSC on a three-year contract. Prior to signing with Hertha, it was claimed that he was close to signing with Italian club S.S. Lazio. Bengtsson later declared he had no interest in signing for Lazio. When Bengtsson signed for Berlin it upset the Italian club, who claimed that he had already signed with them. Lazio took their case to FIFA. Bengtsson only spent one season at the German side as they were relegated from the Bundesliga at the end of the 2009–10 season.

Twente
Bengtsson signed with Dutch Eredivisie side FC Twente on 9 July 2010. He gained a more important role in the Twente defence in the 2012–13 season after having played more sporadically during his first two seasons at the club. Bengtsson was chosen as Twente's club captain in July 2013 ahead of the 2013–14 season. During his time at Twente, Bengtsson has also played in the UEFA Europa League and the UEFA Champions League.

Malmö FF
Bengtsson returned to his youth club Malmö FF on 25 March 2015. He signed a five-year contract lasting until the end of the 2019 season.

After the end of the 2020 season, Malmö FF and Bengtsson parted ways. On April 13, 2021, Bengtsson announced via Swedish newspaper Expressen that he had retired. He won three Allsvenskan titles with the club and played in the 2015–16 UEFA Champions League.

International career
During the 2009 UEFA European Under-21 Football Championship in Sweden, Bengtsson played all Sweden's four matches from start together with Mattias Bjärsmyr. His first cap for the Swedish senior national team came in a friendly against Mexico in January 2009.

Career statistics

Club

International
Appearances and goals per year

Honours
Trelleborgs FF
 Superettan: 2006

Twente
 KNVB Cup: 2010–11
 Johan Cruijff Shield: 2010, 2011

Malmö FF
 Allsvenskan: 2016, 2017, 2020

References

External links
 Malmö FF profile 
 
 

1986 births
Living people
Footballers from Malmö
Swedish footballers
Association football defenders
Sweden international footballers
Sweden under-21 international footballers
Malmö FF players
Trelleborgs FF players
Swedish expatriate footballers
Expatriate footballers in Germany
Expatriate footballers in the Netherlands
Allsvenskan players
Superettan players
Bundesliga players
Regionalliga players
Eredivisie players
Hertha BSC players
Hertha BSC II players
FC Twente players
Swedish expatriate sportspeople in Germany
Swedish expatriate sportspeople in the Netherlands